Canavese may refer to:
Canavese, a subalpine geographical and historical area of North-West Italy which lies today within the Province of Turin in Piedmont.
Canavese (wine) or Piemonte, the range of Italian wines made in the province of Piedmont in the northwestern corner of Italy.
F.C. Canavese, was an Italian association football club located in San Giusto Canavese, Piedmont.